Bahadur Khan, Khan Bahadur or, Bahadur Khan Kokaltash (died 23 November 1697) was a Subahdar of Lahore and Burhanpur appointed by Emperor Aurangzeb and General of the Mughal empire. he was the one of Military Commander of Mughal who defeat Marathas in three major battles but lose one only, as also he involve in Mughal-Maratha wars (1681–1707). he was buried in his tomb located in present Pakistan Tomb of Bahadur Khan.
1697 deaths
Mughal nobility
Mughal Subahdars
Mughal Empire people

Biography 
Bahadur Khan Kokaltash or, full Name with title known as Khan-e-Jahan Bahadur Zafar Jung Kokaltash, was the Mughal Governor, Noblemen and Military Commander of Mughal empire during the reign of emperor Aurangzeb Alamgir I. He was first mentioned in the records by the fact that he was the one of military generals of Aurangzeb, and then later he was appointed the Subedar of Burhanpur, a city located in central india, for (? – 1691). He fought against marathas in many battles, with one of first battles mentioned in February 1672 CE. During the war against marathas at the Battle of Salher, he was a military commander. Many years later, he become Subedar of Burhanpur. When Bahadur khan Kokaltash was going to Aurangabad for his nephew's wedding with a girl from the royal family of Abul Hasan Qutb Shah, he took a force of 3,000 armies with him for the wedding, and he left Burhanpur with an army of 5,000 under his Deputy-Commander Kakar Khan. The maratha ruler Sambhaji got that news then he decided to further bifurcate the force at Burhanpur by feigning a move to attack Surat, forcing the Mughals at Burhanpur to send reinforcement to Surat, the marathas successfully sacked the city. Bahadur Khan angry and get want revenge to Marathas, in 3 April 1680 Marathas ruler Shivaji  died in April-May 1680 CE. Mughal emperor Aurangzeb campaign against marathas for 27 years war between Mughal-Marathas. then Bahadur Khan involved and he fight a Battle of Kalyan in 1682 to 1683, Subedar Bahadur Khan defeated the Maratha army and took over Kalyan. The Maratha ruler Sambhaji attempted a counter offensive, but failed and they were repulsed by Mughal forces. he expanded his conquest in Kalyan, then the year (1682 – 1688) Bahadur Khan Siege at Ramsej at six years war Mughals annexed Ramsej Fort. and he involved the Mughal-Maratha war for ten and half years then Aurangzeb disolved him as Burhanpur Subedar and sent him for Subedari of Lahore in present day Pakistan he appoint as governor post for (11 April 1691 – Midd of 1693) Aurangzeb dismissed him from this office. four years later, Khan-e-Jahan Bahadur Khan Kokaltash died on 23 November 1697 in Lahore and he was buried in his tomb named Tomb of Bahadur Khan.

References 

Mughal generals